Edelsa also Edelsa Grupo Didascalia S.A. is a Spanish language publisher of textbooks and materials for language teaching and studying especially of Spanish as a foreign language.

History
Edelsa was found in 1986 and from the beginning the published books for students of French language as a foreign language. In 1988 they bought Edi 6 publishers with their series called: "Español como Lengua Extranjera (E/L.E.)". Since this time Edelsa is more focused for Spanish textbooks, dictionaries, grammares and other related books. In 1995 Edelsa was bought by French Hachette-Livre publishers from Lagardère group. At this time Edelsa is one of the biggest publishers on the field of Spanish teaching materials of Spanish as a foreign language. Other important publishers on the field are SGEL, DIFUSIÓN, EDICIONES SM and SANTILLANA.

Material

Books
 Para Empezar/Esto funciona
 Ven
 Nuevo Ven
 ECO
 La Pandilla
 Los Trotamundos
 Chicos Chicas
 Primer Plano
 Planet@
 Puesta a Punto
 Punto Final
 ¿A que no sabes...?
 Submarino

Grammars

Multimedia

Other
 Edelsa

Spanish language
Publishing companies of Spain
Publishing companies established in 1986
1986 establishments in Spain
Book publishing companies of Spain